West Kordofan is one of the 18 wilayat or provinces of Sudan. In 2006 it had an area of 111,373 km² and an estimated population of approximately 1,320,405. Al-Fulah is the capital of the state.

In August 2005, West Kordofan State was abolished and its territory divided between North and South Kordofan States, in implementation of the Protocol between the Government of Sudan (GOS) and the Sudan People’s Liberation Movement (SPLM) on the resolution of conflict in Southern Kordofan/Nuba Mountains and Blue Nile States signed at Naivasha, Kenya, 26 May 2004. Section 2.1 of the protocol states that "The boundaries of Southern Kordofan/Nuba Mountains State shall be the same boundaries of former Southern Kordofan Province when Greater Kordofan was sub-divided into two provinces." The protocol forms part of the Comprehensive Peace Agreement between the government of Sudan and the Sudan People's Liberation Movement. Al Fulah presently has the status of second capital of South Kordofan State, and sessions of the state Legislative Council are to alternate between Al Fulah and Kaduqli. The state was reestablished in July 2013.

Districts

 Lagawa District
 As Salam District
 Abyei District (abolished)
(et al.)

Area with "Special Administrative Status", considered part of both South Kordofan and Northern Bahr el Ghazal, under Protocol on the resolution of the Abyei conflict:
 Abyei Area (hatched area on map)

References

External links
 "Darfur - Kordofan Region of Sudan" map, United States Agency for International Development (USAID), 10 April 2002

 
Kurdufan
States and territories established in 1994
States and territories disestablished in 2005
States and territories established in 2013
1994 establishments in Sudan
2013 establishments in Sudan
States of Sudan